Imran Louza (born 1 May 1999) is a professional footballer who plays as a midfielder for EFL Championship club Watford and the Morocco national team.

Louza came through Nantes' youth academy and made his first team debut in 2019, and his international debut in 2021.

Club career

Nantes
Louza joined the youth academy of Nantes in 2006 from Etoile du Cens, and was captain of several youth categories in the club. He made his professional debut with Nantes in a 4–1 Coupe de France win over Châteauroux on 4 January 2019, and scored in his debut.

Watford
On 1 June 2021, Watford completed the signing of Louza from Nantes for a reported fee of €10 million. He signed with The Hornets on a five-year deal lasting until 2026. On 21 August 2021, Louza made his debut for Watford in a 2-0 loss against Brighton.

On 8 October 2022, in Louza's third appearance of the season, he opened his account for Watford with an impressive free-kick to equalise in an eventual 3–1 defeat to Blackpool. On 19 October 2022, Louza was stretchered off during a 3–0 defeat to Millwall. Manager Slaven Bilić would go on to reveal that Louza had fractured his fibula as well as suffering ligament damage, an injury that would rule him out for several months and see him miss the 2022 FIFA World Cup.

International career
Louza was born in France to a Moroccan father and a French mother. He represented the Morocco U20s in a 3–2 friendly win over the France U20s, and scored a goal for his side. He switched to represent France internationally, debuting for the France U20s and U21s.

Louza formally decided to represent the senior Morocco national team and debuted and scored in a 5–0 2022 FIFA World Cup qualification win over Guinea-Bissau on 6 October 2021.

Career statistics

Club

International goals
Scores and results list Morocco's goal tally first.

References

External links

1999 births
Living people
Footballers from Nantes
Moroccan footballers
Morocco international footballers
Morocco youth international footballers
French footballers
France youth international footballers
France under-21 international footballers
Association football midfielders
FC Nantes players
Watford F.C. players
Ligue 1 players
Championnat National 2 players
Championnat National 3 players
Premier League players
English Football League players
Moroccan people of French descent
French sportspeople of Moroccan descent
Moroccan expatriate footballers
French expatriate footballers
Expatriate footballers in England
Moroccan expatriate sportspeople in England
French expatriate sportspeople in England
2021 Africa Cup of Nations players